Tamika Sonja Lawrence is an American actress, singer, and writer.

Early life and education
Lawrence was born on January 11 in Columbus, Ohio. She received her BFA in musical theatre from the University of Arizona.

Career
Lawrence made her off-Broadway debut in the 2011 revival of Rent as the "Seasons of Love" Soloist. Since then she has appeared in seven Broadway shows and made several television and film appearances. In 2017 Lawrence and her band, "The Slay", released their album UGLY. Lawrence won a Grammy for the Dear Evan Hansen album in 2018. Lawrence announced that her debut record, Two Faced, would be released in 2019.

For her performance as Buni in the original off-Broadway production of Black No More, Lawrence was nominated for the 2022 Drama Desk Award for Outstanding Featured Actress in a Musical and Lucille Lortel Award for Outstanding Lead Performer in a Musical.

Acting credits

Theatre

Film

Television

Discography

References

External links
 
 
 
 
 

21st-century American actresses
21st-century American singers
American film actresses
American musical theatre actresses
American television actresses
American sopranos
Living people
American feminists
Feminist musicians
Year of birth missing (living people)
21st-century American women singers